Leucanthemum heterophyllum is a species of flowering plant in the aster family

Description
This plant is perennial, glabrous or hairy. The stem is erect and robust, with a rosette of large basal leaves, petiolate, oblong, serrulate on the edges. It produces solitary white many-stellate flowers. The central disk flowers are tubular, hermaphrodite, yellow. They bloom from June to September.

Distribution
This plant is native to the southern Europe, from the Iberian Peninsula and the Alps up to the Balkans and Caucasus.

Habitat

References
Christoper Brickell (Editor-in-chief): RHS A-Z Encyclopedia of Garden Plants. Third edition. Dorling Kindersley, London 2003]
Hortipedia
Luirig.altervista

heterophyllum